James Finegan may refer to:

James Lysaght Finegan (died 1900), Irish barrister, soldier, merchant and politician
James W. Finegan (1929–2015), American advertising executive, golfer and sportswriter